The Arcus Argentariorum (Latin: Arch of the Money-Changers; in Italian: Arco degli Argentari), is an ancient Roman arch that was partly incorporated in the seventh century into the western wall of the nearby church of San Giorgio al Velabro in Rome, Italy.

History 

It is a widespread misconception that it is a triumphal arch, but it is in fact entirely different in form, with no curves and more resembling an architrave.  Its actual purpose is unknown, but the most probable scenario is that it formed a monumental gate where the vicus Jugarius entered the Forum Boarium.  As the dedicatory inscription says, it was commissioned not by the state or emperor, but by the local money-changers (argentarii) and merchants (negotiantes), in honour of Septimius Severus and his family.  The top was possibly once decorated with statues of the imperial family, now long gone.

It is built of white marble, except for the base which is of travertine. The dedicatory inscription is framed by two bas-reliefs representing Hercules and a genius. The panels lining the passage present two sacrificial scenes — on the right (east), Septimius Severus, Julia Domna and Geta, and on the left (west) side Caracalla with his wife Fulvia Plautilla and father-in-law Gaius Fulvius Plautianus.

The figures of Caracalla's brother, father in law and wife on the passage panels and on the banners on the outside, and their names on the dedicatory inscription, were chiselled out after Caracalla seized sole power and assassinated them.

These sacrificial scenes gave rise to the popular but incorrect saying about the arch that
 
 
Past treasure-hunters interpreted this to mean that there was a treasure hidden inside the arch. They drilled many holes in it, which are still visible.

Above the main reliefs, are smaller panels with Victories or eagles holding up victors' wreaths, and beneath them more sacrificial scenes.  The external decoration of the pillars includes soldiers, barbarian prisoners, military banners (with busts of the imperial family) and a now-damaged figure in a short tunic.

See also
 List of Roman triumphal arches

References
"Passeggiate Romane"

Ancient Roman buildings and structures in Rome
204 establishments
Buildings and structures completed in the 3rd century
Rome R. XII Ripa
Septimius Severus
Caracalla